This article is about an American horse race.  For the Australian horse race, see Matriarch Stakes (Australia).

The Matriarch  Stakes is a Grade I American Thoroughbred horse race for fillies and mares that are of age three-years-old or older over a distance of one mile (8 furlongs) on the turf track scheduled annually in late November at Del Mar Racetrack in Del Mar, California. The event currently carries a purse of $400,000.

History

The inaugural running of the event was on 22 November 1981 at Hollywood Park Racetrack over a distance of one and one-eighth miles on the turf and was won by the Irish-bred import Kilijaro who was ridden by US Hall of Fame jockey Laffit Pincay Jr. and trained by 
US Hall of Fame trainer Charles E. Whittingham defeating the 1980 United States Champion Older Female Horse Glorious Song by  lengths in a time of 1:47 flat. The event would be Kilijaro's last as she would be retired.

The following year the event was split in two divisions and both divisions were won by jockey Ray Sibille.

In 1983, for the third running of the event, American Graded Stakes Committee classified the event with the highest status of Grade I, a classification which the event holds today.

The 1992 US Champion Female Turf Horse Flawlessly won this event for the third time in 1993 and retaining her crown for another year as the US Champion Female Turf Horse.

In 1995 the distance of the event was increased to  miles with purse of $700,000. the event was run at the distance until 1998. In 1999 the distance was reverted back to  miles.

In 2003 the distance of the event was decreased to one mile.

The race was not run in 2005 due to problems with Hollywood Park's grass course not being ready after the turf course was reseeded.

With the closure of Hollywood Park Racetrack in 2013 the event was moved to Del Mar Racetrack.

Although the event is programmed after the Breeders' Cup many fine fillies and mares have won race.
Including 1984 winner Irish-bred Royal Heroine who won the inaugural Breeders' Cup Mile and was crowned US Champion Female Turf Horse. Ryafan won the event as a three-year-old and was awarded US Champion Female Turf Horse in 1997.
French-bred Starine won the event in 2001 and would win the Breeders' Cup Filly & Mare Turf the following year. British bred Intercontinental won the event in 2004 and would also win the Breeders' Cup Filly & Mare Turf the following year and become US Champion Female Turf Horse. The most recent winner of this event to win a Breeders' Cup event was British bred mare Uni who won the Breeders' Cup Mile and was also voted as US Champion Female Turf Horse for 2019.

Records
Speed  record:
1 mile: 1:33.03 – Viadera (GB) (2020)  
 miles: 1:46.06 – Tout Charmant  (2000) 
 miles: 2:00.14 – Wandesta (GB) (1996)

Margins:
 6 lengths  – Squeak (GB) (1998)

Most wins:
 3 - Flawlessly (1991, 1992, 1993)

Most wins by a jockey:
 5 - Chris McCarron (1989, 1991, 1992, 1993, 2000)

Most wins by a trainer:
 8 - Robert J. Frankel (1996, 1997, 1999, 2001, 2003, 2004, 2006, 2007)

Most wins by an owner :
 7 - Juddmonte Farms (1996, 1997, 2003, 2004, 2006, 2009, 2020)

Winners

Legend:

 

Notes:

§ Ran as an entry

ƒ Ran as field entrty

See also
List of American and Canadian Graded races

External links
 2021 Del Mar Media Guide

References

Graded stakes races in the United States
Mile category horse races for fillies and mares
Grade 1 turf stakes races in the United States
Grade 1 stakes races in the United States
Horse races in California
Recurring sporting events established in 1981
1981 establishments in California